"Heaven Knows I'm Missing Him Now" is the twenty-third single by 1960s British girl singer Sandie Shaw, and her final single of that decade, marking the end of a string of singles which had made her the most successful British female singer of that era.

Although the song failed to enter the UK chart, it would later influence 1980s singer Morrissey, a big fan of Shaw, to write a song for his band The Smiths entitled "Heaven Knows I'm Miserable Now", which became one of their biggest hits.

Sandie Shaw songs
1969 songs
1969 singles
Songs written by John Macleod (songwriter)
Songs written by Tony Macaulay
Pye Records singles